İbrahim Ege (born 3 February 1983 in Erzurum) is a Turkish retired football player, who played as a defender.

Honours

Club
Trabzonspor
Turkish Cup: 2003–04

References

External links
 Profile at TFF.org.tr

1983 births
Living people
People from Erzurum
Turkish footballers
Turkey under-21 international footballers
Turkey youth international footballers
Erzurumspor footballers
Trabzonspor footballers
Denizlispor footballers
MKE Ankaragücü footballers
Konyaspor footballers
Mersin İdman Yurdu footballers
Süper Lig players
Association football defenders